Qatar Boneh may refer to:
 Qatar Boneh, Fars